The Maritime Enforcement Specialist (ME) rating is responsible for law enforcement and force protection in the United States Coast Guard—equivalent to the Navy’s counterpart Master-at-arms (United States Navy). Additionally, these personnel are trained in traditional maritime law enforcement, anti-terrorism, force protection, port security and safety, and unit-level training.

History
A recent addition to the personnel of the U.S. Coast Guard inventory, Coast Guardsmen in the ME rating are trained and qualified to provide security and law enforcement support for U.S. Coast Guard assets.  The first class of Coast Guardsmen graduated from ME "A" School on 14 April 2010.

Training and qualifications
Personnel selected to attend the 10-week long ME "A" School, located in Charleston, South Carolina at the Federal Law Enforcement Training Centers must first meet certain eligibility requirements.  The following are the eligibility criteria to be selected as an ME:
Minimum ASVAB score: VE + AR = 100
Eligible for a secret clearance. Commands must certify that the member is a U. S. citizen and has an approved NACLC security package on file.
Normal color perception in accordance with the Medical Manual, COMDTINST M6000.1 (series).
Member is within maximum allowable weight in accordance with Allowable Weight Standards for Coast Guard Military Personnel, COMDTINST M1020.8 (series).
Eligible to possess a firearm (Lautenberg Amendment Compliance - DD 2760) in accordance with COMDTINST 10100.1(series).
A valid state drivers license.
24 months of obligated service from date of graduation.

References

External links
 https://www.youtube.com/watch?v=OLNknV1PXwo
 https://www.gocoastguard.com/active-duty-careers/enlisted-opportunities/view-job-descriptions/rate/ME
 https://www.fletc.gov/academies
 https://www.uscg.mil/mlea/mea/

Coast Guard M
United States Coast Guard job titles